Dutch culture may refer to:
 used more narrowly, the Culture of the Netherlands
 used more widely, the culture of Dutch-speaking Europe, including:
Dutch architecture
Dutch literature
Dutch music
Dutch festivities
Dutch folklore

See also
Dutch people
The Netherlands
Flanders (Belgium)